Vaishali district of Bihar, India is divided into 3 sub-divisions and 16 Blocks. There are total 290 panchayat and 1414 villages.

List of villages by block
List of villages in Bhagwanpur block
List of villages in Bidupur block
List of villages in Chehrakala block
List of villages in Desri block
List of villages in Goraul block
List of villages in Hajipur block
List of villages in Jandaha block
List of villages in Lalganj block
List of villages in Mahnar block
List of villages in Mahua block
List of villages in Patedhi Belsar block
List of villages in Patepur block
List of villages in Raghopur block
List of villages in Rajapakar block
List of villages in Sahdei Buzurg block
List of villages in Vaishali block

Village list
 Ababakarpur
 Abulhasanpur
 Adalpur
 Afazalpur Dhobghati Saidpur
 Agrail Khurdh
 Akbar Malahi
 Akhtiyarpur Sehan
 Alinagar Levdhan
 Alipur Hatta
 Amer
 Amritpur
 Anawarpur
 Andharwara
 Ararah
 Arniya
 Asoee Lachhiram
 Atwarpur Sisaula
 Awabakarpur Koahi
 Azampur
 Azizpur Chande
 Bafapur Banthu
 Bahrampur
 Bahsi Saidpur
 Bahuara
 Bahuara
 Baikunth Pur
 Bajitpur Chak Kasturi
 Bajitpur Saidat
 Bakadh
 Bakarpur
 Bakhri Barai
 Baksama
 Baligaon
 Banthu
 Bardiha Turki
 Basanta Jahanabad
 Basantpur
 Basti Sarsikan
 Basudevpur Chandel
 Bela Dargah
 Belsar
 Berai
 Bhadwas
 Bhagwanpur Ratti
 Bhagwatpur
 Bhairokhara
 Bhalui
 Bhanpur Barewa
 Bhautauli Bhagwan
 Bhikhanpura
 Bhualpur Urf Bahadurpur
 Bidupr
 Bihwarpur
 Bishunpur Baladhari
 Bishunpura 
 Borhan Urf Rasulpur Gaus
 Chainpur 
 Chak Alahdad
 Chak Gulamuddin
 Chakjamal
 Chakath Kursi Kushiyari
 Chakfaiz Asif
 Chakjado
 Chaksikandar (Kalyanpur)
 Chaksingar
 Chaksurupan
 Chakunda Urf Milki
 Chamarhara
 Chandwara
 Chand Sarai
 Chandpur Fatah
 Chandpura Nankhar
Chechar
 Chehra Kalan
 Chhaurahi
 Chintamanipur
 Dabhaich
 Dadhua
 Dargah Bela
 Daud Nagar
 Daudnagar
 Daulat Pur Dewaria
 Daulatpur Chandi
 Dayalpur
 Dedhpura
 Desari
 Dharampur Ramrai
 Dighikala East
 Dighikala West
 Dih Buchauli
 Dilawarpur Gobardhan
 Enayat Nagar
 Fatahpur Pakri
 Fatehpur
 Fulwaria
 Gadai Sarai
 Gauspur Chakmazahid
 Ghataro Chaturbhuj Middle
 Ghataro Chaturbhuj South
 Godhiya Chaman
 Goraul Bhagwanpur
 Gorigama
 Goshpur Ezra
 Govindpur Jhakhraha
 Govindpur Bela
 Gurmiya
 Harlochanpur Sukki
 Harprasad
 Harpur Phatikwara
 Harwanshpur Banthu
 Hasanpur North
 Hasanpur Osti
 Hasanpur South
 Hazrat Jandaha
 Hilalpur
 Husaina Khurd
 Ishmailpur
 Ismailpur
 Jafarpatti
 Jafrabad
 Jafrabad Tok
 Jahangirpur
 Jahangirpur Patedha
 Jahangirpur Salkhanni
 Jahangirpur Sham
 Jalalpur Birbhan
  Kaila Jalalpur
  Gangti
 Jarang Rampur
 Jatkauli
 Jurawanpur
 Jurawanpur Barari
 Jurawanpur Karari
 Kanchanpur
 Kanhauli Dhanraj
 Kanhauli Vishanparsi
 Kartaha
 Kartaha Buzurg
 Karhari
 Karhatiya Buzurg
 Karnauti
 Karnezi
 Kashipur Chakbibi
 Katar Mala
 Kathaulia
 Kernpura
 Khaje Chand Chhapra
 Khanpur Pakri
 Kharauna
 Khesrahi
 Khilwat
 Khopi
 Khoyajpur Basti
 Kiratpur Raja Ram
 Kutubpur
 Ladho
 Lagurao Vilnupur
 Lawapur Mahnar
 Lawapur Narayan
 Laxmanpur
 Laxmi Narayanpur
 Laxmipur Barhbatta
 Lodi Pur
 Loma
 Madarna
 Madhopur Mahodat
 Madhopur Ram
 Mahamdabad
 Mahammadpur Turi
 Mahindwara
 Mahipura
 Mahisaur
 Mahthi Dhramchand
 Mahua Mukundpur
 Mahua Singhrai
 Maile
 Majhauli
 Majhauli
 Majhauli Mahmadpur Buzurg
 Majlispur
 Mallikpur
 Malpur
 Mandai Dih
 Manganpur
 Mangurahi
 Manora
 Mansinghpur Bijhrauli
 Mansurpur Halaiya
 Manua
 Marui
 Matiya
 Mathna Milik
 Mathura
 Maudah Buzurg
 Maudah Chatur
 Mazrohi Urf Saharia
 Meghpur
 Mirpur Patadh
 Mirza Nagar
 Mishraulia Afzalpur
 Miya Bairo
 Mohamadpur Pojha
 Mohammadpur
 Mohanpur
 Mohiuddinpur (Dhala)
 Mohiuddinpur Garahi
 Mohmadpur
 Mukundpur Bhath
 Murauwatpur
 Musapur Subodh
 Nagwa
 Narayanpur
 Narayanpur Buzurg
 Narharpur
 Nari Khurd
 Naurangpur
 Nawanagar
 Naya Gaon West
 Nayagaon East
 Nilo Rukundpur
 Nirpur
 Pachpaika
 Paharpur West
 Paharpur East
 Paharpur Vishunpur
 Pahetiya
 Pakauli
 Panapur Langa
 Paura Madan Singh
 Peerapur
 Phulad
 Pirapur Mathura
 Piroi Shamsuddin
 Pohiyar Buzurg
 Prataptand East
 Prataptand West
 Purainia
 Puran Thand
 Purkhauli
 RaghopurDiyara
 Raghopur East
 Raghopur Narsanda
 Raghunathpur Imadpur
 Rahimapur
 Rahimpur
 Rajapakar North
 Rajapakar South
 Rajasan
 Ramdauli
 Rampur Bakhra
 Rampur Chandrabhan Urf Dagru
 Rampur Ratnakar
 Rampur Shyamchand
 Rasalpur Urf Madhaul
 Rasulpur Fatah
 Rasulpur Habib
 Rasulpur Korigawan
 Rasulpur Mobarak
 Rasulpur Purshottam
 Rasulpur Turki
 Ratanpura
 Rikhar
 Rustampur
 Sahatha
 Sahdei Buzurg
 Said Mohamm
 Sihma kanth
 Jarang rampur

References

Lists of villages in Vaishali district
Vaishali district